The 2009–10 season was Al-Ahly's 53rd season in the Egyptian Premier League. Al-Ahly was looking to defend their fifth title in a row.

Pre-season games
Al-Ahly announced that the six fixtures of their 2009 pre-season would be in Germany and England. On July 3, 2009, Al-Ahly played their first pre-season match in Gelsenkirchen, Germany against FC Gelsenkirchen. Later that day, Al-Ahly also played their first match of the Zayton Cup against the Turkish team Galatasaray, and 3 days later they played the German Bayer 04 Leverkusen. The last match was on July 11 against the Moroccan team Wydad Casablanca. After their match against Haras El Hodood in the Egyptian Super Cup, Al-Ahly's 23 players went to London to play in the Wembley Cup against Celtic and Barcelona on 24th and 26 July.

Egyptian Super Cup

As the Egyptian Premier League 2008–09 champions, Al-Ahly kicked off the 2009–10 season with the traditional match in the Egyptian Super Cup against 2009 Egypt Cup champion Haras El Hodood on July 21.

Egyptian Premier League
Al-Ahly's opening game of the Egyptian Premier League 2009–10 was on August 6 against Ghazl El-Mehalla. Al-Ahly's coach Hossam El-Badry, who took over the club following the departure of Portuguese Manuel José at the end of the previous season, employed an unusual 4-4-2 formation. Despite the bad opening of the season in the super cup defeat against Haras El Hodood Al-Ahly beat Ghazl El-Mehalla 2–0. Ahmed Hassan made the opening score after 40 minutes and Francis Doe brought the score up to two 66 minutes into his Egyptian Premier League debut. The next game was a narrow 2–1 win over Ittihad El-Shorta in an unbroadcast game on 19 August. Former Ahly player Ahmed Galal scored the first goal of the game after 31 minutes, but 4 minutes later Ahly's player Ahmed Hassan scored equalizing the score. In the second-half substitute Hussein Yasser scored Al-Ahly's second goal in the 80th minute to secure Ahly's second win of the season.

On 23 August, Al-Ahly played their third match of the season against Haras El Hodood in a 1–1 draw, Haras El Hodood player Ahmed Salama scored the opener 69 minutes in and Ahmed Hassan scored the equalizer nine minutes later.

CAF Champions League

Group stage

Semi-finals 

Ahly 2–2 Espérance on aggregate. Espérance won on away goals rule and advances to the 2010 CAF Champions League final.

2009–2010 Squad
As September 12, 2009.

Transfers
Players in / out

In

Out

See also
Al-Ahly

References

2009-10
Egyptian football clubs 2009–10 season